Tony Hall  may refer to:

 Tony P. Hall (born 1942), American politician, representative and ambassador
 Tony Hall, Baron Hall of Birkenhead (born 1951), former Director-General of the BBC
 Tony Hall (Australian footballer) (born 1964), Australian rules footballer
 Tony Hall (footballer, born 1969), played for East Fife, Berwick and some Irish clubs
 Tony Hall (journalist), South African journalist and member of the South African Congress of Democrats
 Tony Hall (supervisor) (born 1942), former member of San Francisco Board of Supervisors
 Tony Hall (music executive) (1928–2019), British music executive and former record producer and DJ
 Tony Hall (musician) (born 1941), melodeon player born in Beccles, Suffolk (England)
 Tony Hall (botanist), Kew Gardens Expert, former manager of the Alpine House; see List of botanists by author abbreviation (T–V)

See also
 Anthony Hall (disambiguation)